Bertolli is a brand of Italian food products. It may also refer to:

People 

 Francesca Bertolli, an Italian contralto of the 18th century
 Paul Bertolli, a chef, writer, and artisan food producer in the San Francisco Bay

See also 

 Bertoli